The 61st annual Venice International Film Festival was held between 1 and 11 September 2004. The festival opened with Steven Spielberg's The Terminal, and closed with Katsuhiro Otomo's Steamboy. The Golden Lion was awarded to the film Vera Drake, directed by Mike Leigh.

On this edition of the festival, a new independent section, Venice Days (Giornate degli autori), has started "for free cinema, new talents and new stories". This section is organized by the ANAC (National Association of Cinematographic Authors) and the API (Independent Authors & Producers). Also in this edition, The Secret History of Italian Cinema was launched, a new section of the official selection, with the aim of restoring and systematically rediscovering sides of the Italian cinema that have been "forgotten, invisible, unknown or misunderstood". The retrospective was planned for four years, which was extended by a two-year retrospective called These Phantoms: Italian Cinema Rediscovered, followed by one edition of Italian Comedy Retrospective. The Fondazione Prada was the private sector partner of this series.

Juries
The following people comprised the 2004 juries:

Main Competition (Venezia 61)
 John Boorman (UK) Jury President
 Wolfgang Becker (Germany)
 Mimmo Calopresti (Italy)
 Scarlett Johansson (USA)
 Spike Lee (USA)
 Dusan Makavejev (Serbia and Montenegro)
 Helen Mirren (UK)
 Pietro Scalia (Italy)
 Hsu Feng (Taiwan)

Horizons (Orizzonti)
 Nicolas Philibert (France) President
 Brian Helgeland (USA)
 Fiorella Infascelli (Italy)

Venezia Cinema Digitale
 Mike Figgis (UK) President
 Shozo Ichiyama (Japan)
 Claire Simon (Morocco-France)

Official selection

In competition
The main competitive section of the official selection is an international competition of feature films running for the Golden Lion.

Highlighted title indicates the Golden Lion winner.    † indicates films that competed for the Lion of the Future.

Out of competition
The following films of the official selection were screened as "out of competition":

Horizons
A section aiming to provide a picture of the new trends in cinema.

Highlighted title indicates the Horizons Awards for Best Film.    † indicates films that competed for the Lion of the Future.

Short film competition
The following films, whose length does not exceed 30 minutes, were selected for the short film competition (Corto Cortissimo):

Highlighted title indicates Lion for Best Short Film winner.

Venetian Nights
The following films were screened for the Venetian Nights section (Venezia Mezzanotte):

 † indicates films that competed for the Lion of the Future.

Venice Digital Cinema
A section intended to provide an overview of the new expressive possibilities granted by digital technologies.

 † indicates films that competed for the Lion of the Future.

The Secret History of Italian Cinema 1
A new retrospective section on Italian Cinema aiming to restore and systematically rediscover sides of the Italian cinema That Have Been "Forgotten, Invisible, Unknown Or Misunderstood". This first edition of the retrospective is titled Italian Kings of the B's.

Autonomous sections

Venice International Film Critics' Week
The following feature films were selected to be screened as In Competition for this section:

 † indicates films that competed for the Lion of the Future.

Venice Days
The following films were selected for the 1st edition of Venice Days (Giornate Degli Autori) autonomous section:

Awards

Official selection
The following Official Awards were conferred at the 61st edition:
 Golden Lion: Vera Drake by Mike Leigh
 Silver Lion for Best Director: 3-Iron by Kim Ki-duk
 Grand Jury Prize: The Sea Inside (Mar adentro) by Alejandro Amenábar
 Volpi Cup for Best Actor: Javier Bardem for The Sea Inside
 Volpi Cup for Best Actress: Imelda Staunton for Vera Drake
 Marcello Mastroianni Award (for the best emerging actor or actress): Tommaso Ramenghi and Marco Luisi for Lavorare con lentezza
 Golden Osella: Studio Ghibli for Howl's Moving Castle (Hauru no ugoku shiro)

Special Awards
 Special Lion for Overall Work: Manoel de Oliveira and Stanley Donen

Horizons awards (Premi Orizzonti)
 Best Film: Les petits fils by Ilan Duran Cohen
Special mention: Vento di terra by Vincenzo Marra

Digital Cinema Award
 20 Fingers (20 angosht) by Mania Akbari
Special Mention: La vita è breve ma la giornata è lunghissima by Gianni Zanasi and Lucio Pellegrini

Short Film awards (Corto Cortissimo Lion)
 Citroen Short Super-Short Lion for Best Short Film: Signe d'appartenence by Kamel Cherif
Special mention: The Carpenter and His Clumsy Wife by Peter Foot
 UIP Prize for Best European Short Film: Goodbye by Steve Hudson

Autonomous sections
The following official and collateral awards were conferred to films of the autonomous sections:

Venice International Film Critics' Week
 Lion Of The Future 
 "Luigi de Laurentiis" Award For A Debut Film: Le Grand Voyage by Ismaël Ferroukhi and Humbert Balsan
Special Mention: Saimir by Francesco Munzi

Other collateral awards
The following collateral awards were conferred to films of the official selection:

FIPRESCI Prize:
Competition: Bin-jip (Kim Ki-duk)
Parallel Sections: Vento di terra (Vincenzo Marra)
SIGNIS Award:
Tout un hiver sans feu (Greg Zglinski)
Honorable Mention: Bin-jip (Kim Ki-duk)
C.I.C.A.E. Award:
Gilles' Wife (Frédéric Fonteyne)
UNICEF Award:
Dom durakov (Andrei Konchalovsky)
UNESCO Award:
Land of Plenty (Wim Wenders)
Pasinetti Award:
Best Film: Le chiavi di casa (Gianni Amelio)
Best Actor: Le chiavi di casa (Kim Rossi Stuart)
Best Actress: 5x2 (Valeria Bruni Tedeschi)
Audience Award (Critics' Week):
To Take a Wife (Ronit Elkabetz and Shlomi Elkabetz)
Isvema Award:
To Take a Wife (Ronit Elkabetz and Shlomi Elkabetz)
FEDIC Award:
Volevo solo dormirle addosso (Eugenio Cappuccio)
Little Golden Lion:
Bin-jip (Kim Ki-duk)
Label Europa Cinemas:
Darwin's Nightmare (Hubert Sauper)
Young Cinema Award:
Best Italian Film: Nemmeno il destino (Daniele Gaglianone)
Best Digital Film: Un silenzio particolare (Stefano Rulli)
Best International Film: Mar adentro (Alejandro Amenábar)
"Lino Miccichè" First Feature Award:
Nemmeno il destino (Daniele Gaglianone)
Open Prize:
Sag-haye velgard (Marzieh Makhmalbaf)
Lina Mangiacapre Award:
Melancholian 3 huonetta (Pirjo Honkasalo)
Future Film Festival Digital Award:
Collateral (Michael Mann)
Laterna Magica Prize:
Finding Neverland (Marc Forster)
Sergio Trasatti Award:
Le chiavi di casa (Gianni Amelio)
CinemAvvenire Award:
Best Film: Le chiavi di casa (Gianni Amelio)
Best First Film: Tout un hiver sans feu (Greg Zglinski)
Cinema for Peace Award: Promised Land (Amos Gitai)
Award of the City of Rome:
Best Film: Un mundo menos peor (Alejandro Agresti)
International Peace Award:
Best Film: Jeruzalemski sindrom (Jakov Sedlar)
Human Rights Film Network Award:
Melancholian 3 huonetta (Pirjo Honkasalo)
EIUC Award:
Yesterday (Darrell Roodt)
Special Mention: Melancholian 3 huonetta (Pirjo Honkasalo)
Special Director's Award:
Bin-jip (Kim Ki-duk)
Special Pasinetti Award:
Vento di terra (Vincenzo Marra) (For an innovative film)

References

External links

Venice Film Festival 2004 Awards on IMDb

Ven
Venice Film Festival
V
V
Film
September 2004 events in Europe